Mar Chiquita (in Spanish literally "Little Sea") or Mar de Ansenuza is an endorheic salt lake located in the northeast of the province of Córdoba, in central Argentina. The northeast corner of the lake also extends into southeastern Santiago del Estero Province. It is the largest of the naturally occurring saline lakes in Argentina. The lake is located in parts of five departments in the two provinces.

The lake is in the Argentine Espinal ecoregion.
It occupies the southern part of a depression that measures about 50 miles/80 km (north–south) by 28 miles/45 km (east–west). Its surface area varies considerably, given its shallow depth (about 10 m), and ranges between 2000 and 6000 km² (1242 and 3728 mi²).

Hydrology
Mar Chiquita is fed primarily by the saline waters of the Dulce River, coming from Santiago del Estero in the north after being joined by the Saladillo River. The lands around the lower course of the Dulce and Mar Chiquita are wetlands, populated by a large biodiversity (especially aquatic birds). From the southwest the lake receives the flow of the Primero/Suquía and the Segundo/Xanaes rivers, as well as several streams; these inflows vary greatly from dry to rainy seasons. The salinity of Mar Chiquita is quite variable, with measured extremes ranging from 250 g/L in times of low water levels to around 40 g/L in very humid years, such as in the decade following 1977, when record rainfall flooded much of Miramar, Córdoba.

There are several islands in the lake, the most important one being the Médano Island. Mar Chiquita is slowly diminishing in volume due to increased evaporation and elevation of its bottom, and is ultimately bound to turn into a salt flat. According to the Mono Lake Committee, Aves Argentinas and Argentina Natura International are attempting to establish "the largest National Park in Argentina at Laguna Mar Chiquita, the" (northern) "winter home to large concentrations of Wilson's Phalaropes."

References
 Hydrography of Córdoba
 Government of Córdoba Province — Water and Sanitation Office
 NASA Earth Observatory — Dust Storm in Argentina

Notes 

Lakes of Argentina
Endorheic lakes of South America
Saline lakes of South America
Landforms of Córdoba Province, Argentina
Ramsar sites in Argentina